Doing It Right or Doin' It Right may refer to:

Music

Albums
Doin' It Right, a 1972 album by Denise LaSalle
Doin' It Right, a 1972 album by Mike James Kirkland
Doin' It Right, a 1989 album by Hilton Ruiz
Doin' It Right, a 2003 album by Freddie McKay
Hecho y Derecho (Doin' It Right), a 1973 album by Joe Cuba

Songs
"Doin' It Right", a 2013 song by Daft Punk
"Doin' It Right", a 1975 song by The Boomtown Rats later reissued on The Boomtown Rats
"Doin' It Right", a 1980 song by the Powder Blues Band from Uncut
"Doin' It Right", a 1981 song by Barbara Mandrell from Barbara Mandrell Live
"Doin' It Right", a 1989 song by Hilton Ruiz
"Doin' It Right", a 2002 song by Sizzla
"Doin' It Right", a 2003 song by Kenny Loggins from It's About Time
"Doin' It Right", a 2005 song by Steve Azar
"Doing It Right", a 2007 song by The Go! Team from Proof of Youth
"Doin' It Right", a 2013 single by Rodney Atkins
"Doin' It Right", a 2017 song by Carly Pearce from Every Little Thing

Other uses
Doing It Right (scuba diving), an approach to scuba diving focusing on dive kit setup, safety and procedure
Doin It Right, a 1995 film featuring Jason Stuart

See also
Doing It Wrong (disambiguation)